"Breakfast at Tiffany's" is a song by American alternative rock band Deep Blue Something. Originally appearing on their 1993 album 11th Song, it was later re-recorded and released on their 1995 album Home. Released as a single in July 1995, the song was the band's only hit in the United States, peaking at number five on the US Billboard Hot 100 in January 1996. Outside the United States, "Breakfast at Tiffany's" topped the UK Singles Chart and peaked within the top ten on the charts of Australia, Flanders, Canada, Denmark, Germany, Iceland, Ireland, and Sweden.

Todd Pipes said in a Q magazine article about the promotion of "Breakfast at Tiffany's", "As the song had 'breakfast' in the title, radio stations thought it would be genius to have us on at breakfast time. We'd be up 'til 3 am and they'd wonder why we were pissed off playing at 6 am." Follow-up singles failed to match the success of "Breakfast at Tiffany's", hence the reason for the band's classification as a one-hit wonder.

Inspiration and composition
"Breakfast at Tiffany's" is sung from the point of view of a man whose girlfriend is on the verge of breaking up with him because the two have nothing in common. Desperate to find something, the man brings up the Audrey Hepburn film Breakfast at Tiffany's, and his girlfriend recalls that they "both kinda liked it." He argues that this should serve as enough motivation for them to work out their problems based on the notion that love will always find a way to make things work.

The film Roman Holiday inspired the lyrics of the song, but songwriter Todd Pipes thought that one of Hepburn's other films would make a better song title.

Critical reception
Brian Wahlert called "Breakfast at Tiffany's" "a cute, catchy song that should fit in well on adult contemporary, Top-40 and alternative radio" with memorable melody that makes it "a perfect single, along with the mildly repetitive, conversational lyrics of the chorus and the bright, acoustic guitar". However, Tom Sinclair of Entertainment Weekly was unimpressed. He called it "possibly the year's most innocuous single, 'Breakfast at Tiffany's' is distressingly prosaic pop from a wimpy-sounding Texas quartet"; he added that it lacked any "musical piquancy". The Houston Press listed the song as the second worst by an artist from Texas, after Vanilla Ice's "Ice Ice Baby". British magazine Music Week rated it five out of five, picking it as Single of the Week. They wrote, "Radio-friendly rock at its best from the Texan trio. A mighty, bright chorus, quirky lyrics and some great guitar work should enable it to come close in the UK to matching its Top Five placing Stateside." VH1 and Blender ranked the song number six on their list of the "50 Most Awesomely Bad Songs Ever".

Music video
The accompanying music video for "Breakfast at Tiffany's" features the band members arriving to a breakfast table and being served by butlers, beside the curb in front of Tiffany & Co. in Midtown Manhattan. At the end of the video a young woman dressed in a similar style to Holly Golightly's (Audrey Hepburn) from the beginning of the film, except dressed in white rather than black, walks past on the sidewalk, and takes off her sunglasses. The band is also seen performing the song in a field, and on the bed of a flatbed truck in NYC.

Track listings
 US cassette single
A1. "Breakfast at Tiffany's" (LP version) – 4:11
A2. "Breakfast at Tiffany's" (Crunch mix) – 4:11
B1. "A Water Prayer" (LP version) – 3:20
B2. "Breakfast at Tiffany's" (LP version) – 4:11

 Australian CD and cassette single, UK CD single
 "Breakfast at Tiffany's" – 4:16
 "A Water Prayer" – 3:19
 "Sun" – 4:15

 UK cassette single and European CD single
 "Breakfast at Tiffany's" – 4:16
 "A Water Prayer" – 3:19

Charts and certifications

Weekly charts

Year-end charts

Certifications

Release history

Other uses
 On Top Gear, episode 8 of series 5, the song can be heard attempting to drown out a rattling from the dashboard of Jeremy Clarkson's Ferrari 612 Scaglietti.
 In 2008, the song was used in a commercial in Slovakia for Orange cellular phone.
 In 2010, the song appeared in a Saturday Night Live skit, with four friends (played by Will Forte, Jason Sudeikis, Bill Hader and Ryan Phillippe) talking during the verses and singing the choruses.
 In August 2011, it was voted into fifth place by fans on Quietdrive's upcoming cover album, Your Record, Our Spin.
 In May 2012, Episode 24 of New Girl highlighted the cast members dancing to this song. The group was listening to this song from Nick's mixtape where he was trying to convince himself to stay together with a likewise dissimilar girlfriend.
 The song appeared in the fifth episode of the VH1 series Hindsight.
 The song also appeared in the season 2 finale of Orange Is the New Black, eliciting a comment from a prison guard.
 In 2018, the song was played on Netflix series Everything Sucks!.

References

External links
 VH1

1995 debut singles
1995 songs
1996 singles
Deep Blue Something songs
Interscope Records singles
Number-one singles in Scotland
UK Singles Chart number-one singles